The Astronomer's Dream, or the Man in the Moon (literally "The Moon from One Meter Off") is an 1898 French short silent film by Georges Méliès. Based on one of his stage magic acts, and starring Méliès himself, the film presents a varied assortment of images and imaginings dreamed by the astronomer of the title, focusing on themes of astronomy and especially the Moon.

Plot

In an observatory, an astronomer is studying at his desk. Satan appears, then a woman appears and makes Satan vanish. Then she disappears. The astronomer draws a globe on a blackboard. The globe develops a sun-like head and limbs and starts to move on the blackboard. The astronomer looks through a small telescope. The Moon appears in a building as a large face. It has eaten the astronomer's telescope. Additionally, men tumble from its mouth. Then the Moon is in the sky. In a different dress, the astronomer stands on a table, which disappears. He falls.

The Moon becomes a crescent. The mythological goddess Phoebe (i.e., Selene) appears from it. The astronomer chases her, but she eludes him. Then another figure stands in the crescent of the Moon before reclining into its C shape. The Moon appears as a prominent face again, and the astronomer jumps into its mouth. A woman and Satan appear. The astronomer appears again. Then, in the observatory, the astronomer sits asleep in his chair.

Production
Méliès plays the astronomer in the film, which is based on a stage magic sketch he had presented in 1891 at his Paris magic venue, the Théâtre Robert-Houdin. The stage version, "Les Farces de la Lune ou les Mésaventures de Nostradamus", combined theatrical illusions with shadow puppetry. The film version uses a combination of stage machinery (including the giant puppet Moon face), pyrotechnics, and substitution splices for its illusions. Phoebe, goddess of the moon, was played by Jehanne d'Alcy, whom Méliès would marry some 30 years later. The two small clowns are played by the same children who had appeared in Méliès's film The Famous Box Trick, earlier that year.

Release
The Astronomer's Dream was released by Méliès's Star Film Company and is numbered 160–162 in its catalogues. In the French catalogues, a subtitle divided the film into three scenes: La Lune à un mètre (1—l'observatoire; 2—la Lune; 3—Phœbé). The film was Méliès's third, after The Haunted Castle (1896) and The Laboratory of Mephistopheles (1897), to be longer than 60 meters.

When the film was imported to the United States by producer Sigmund Lubin in 1899, he retitled it A Trip to the Moon. However, it should not be confused with Méliès's 1902 film A Trip to the Moon.

References

External links

French silent short films
French black-and-white films
Films directed by Georges Méliès
Articles containing video clips
1898 horror films
Demons in film
The Devil in film
Moon in film
French horror films
1898 short films
Selene
Films about deities
Films based on classical mythology
Silent horror films